Lothian is one of the eight electoral regions of the Scottish Parliament. Nine of the parliament's 73 first past the post constituencies are sub-divisions of the region and it elects seven of the 56 additional-member Members of the Scottish Parliament (MSPs). Thus it elects a total of 16 MSPs. The region is located in the eastern area of the Central Belt of the Scottish Lowlands and is anchored by capital city of Scotland, Edinburgh.

The Lothian region was created as a result of the First Periodic Review of Scottish Parliament Boundaries and largely replaced the 
Lothians region.

Constituencies and local government areas

As a result of the First Periodic Review of Scottish Parliament Boundaries the boundaries for the region and constituencies were redrawn for the 2011 Scottish Parliament election.

Members of the Scottish Parliament

Constituency MSPs

Regional list MSPs
Elections take place on a whole-region basis: candidates shown in the same column have no particular relationship to each other.

[a] As Margo MacDonald was elected as an Independent MSP, there was no mechanism to appoint a replacement; following her death, her seat remained vacant until the Scottish Parliament general election in May 2016.
[b] Stood down 15 July 2019, replaced by Sarah Boyack.
[c] Upon the death of David McLetchie, he was replaced by Cameron Buchanan as the next name on the Lothian regional list for the Scottish Conservatives.
[d] Originally sat as a Scottish Green MSP until December 2020.

Election results

2021 Scottish Parliament election

Constituency results 
{| class=wikitable
!colspan=4 style=background-color:#f2f2f2|2021 Scottish Parliament election: Lothian
|-
! colspan=2 style="width: 200px"|Constituency
! style="width: 150px"|Elected member
! style="width: 300px"|Result

Additional member results

2016 Scottish Parliament election 
In the 2016 Scottish Parliament election the region elected MSPs as follows:
 6 Scottish National Party MSPs (all constituency members)
 4 Conservative MSPs (one constituency member and three additional members)
 3 Labour MSPs (one constituency member and two additional members)
 2 Green MSPs (both additional members)
 1 Liberal Democrats MSP (constituency member)

Constituency results 
{| class=wikitable
!colspan=4 style=background-color:#f2f2f2|2016 Scottish Parliament election: Lothian
|-
! colspan=2 style="width: 200px"|Constituency
! style="width: 150px"|Elected member
! style="width: 300px"|Result

Additional member results 
{| class=wikitable
!colspan=8 style=background-color:#f2f2f2|2016 Scottish Parliament election: Lothians
|-
! colspan="2" style="width: 150px"|Party
! Elected candidates
! style="width: 40px"|Seats
! style="width: 40px"|+/−
! style="width: 50px"|Votes
! style="width: 40px"|%
! style="width: 40px"|+/−%
|-

2011 Scottish Parliament election 
In the 2011 Scottish Parliament election the region elected MSPs as follows:
 8 Scottish National Party MSPs (eight constituency members)
 4 Labour MSPs (one constituency members and three additional member)
 2 Conservative MSPs (two additional members)
 1 Scottish Greens MSP (additional member)
 1 Independent MSP (additional member)

Constituency results 
{| class=wikitable
!colspan=4 style=background-color:#f2f2f2|2011 Scottish Parliament election: Lothian
|-
! colspan=2 style="width: 200px"|Constituency
! style="width: 150px"|Elected member
! style="width: 300px"|Result

Additional member results 
{| class=wikitable
!colspan=8 style=background-color:#f2f2f2|2011 Scottish Parliament election: Lothians
|-
! colspan="2" style="width: 150px"|Party
! Elected candidates
! style="width: 40px"|Seats
! style="width: 40px"|+/−
! style="width: 50px"|Votes
! style="width: 40px"|%
! style="width: 40px"|+/−%
|-

Footnotes 

Lothian
Scottish Parliamentary regions
Scottish Parliament constituencies and regions from 2011
Politics of Edinburgh
Politics of West Lothian
Politics of East Lothian
Politics of Midlothian